The Rashba–Edelstein effect (REE) is a spintronics-related effect, consisting in the conversion of a bidimensional charge current into a spin accumulation. This effect is an intrinsic charge-to-spin conversion mechanism and it was predicted in 1990 by the scientist V.M. Edelstein. It has been demonstrated in 2013 and confirmed by several experimental evidences in the following years.

Its origin can be ascribed to the presence of spin-polarized surface or interface states. Indeed, a structural inversion symmetry breaking (i.e., a structural inversion asymmetry (SIA)) causes the Rashba effect to occur: this effect breaks the spin degeneracy of the energy bands and it causes the spin polarization being locked to the momentum in each branch of the dispersion relation. If a charge current flows in these spin-polarized surface states, it generates a spin accumulation. In the case of a bidimensional Rashba gas, where this band splitting occurs, this effect is called  Rashba–Edelstein effect.

For what concerns a class of peculiar materials, called topological insulators (TI), spin-splitted surface states exist due to the surface topology, independently from the Rashba effect. Topological insulators, indeed, display a spin-splitted linear dispersion relation on their surfaces (i.e., spin-polarized Dirac cones), while having a band gap in the bulk (this is why these materials are called insulators). Also in this case, spin and momentum are locked and, when a charge current flows in these spin-polarized surface states, a spin accumulation is produced and this effect is called Edelstein effect. In both cases, a 2D charge-to-spin conversion mechanism occurs.

The reverse process is called inverse Rashba–Edelstein effect and it converts a spin accumulation into a bidimensional charge current, resulting in a 2D spin-to-charge conversion.

The Rashba–Edelstein effect and its inverse effect are classified as a spin-charge interconversion (SCI) mechanisms, as the direct and inverse spin Hall effect, and materials displaying these effects are promising candidate for becoming spin injectors, detectors and for other future technological applications.

The Rashba–Edelstein effect is a surface effect, at variance with the spin Hall effect which is a bulk effect. Another difference among the two, is that the Rashba–Edelstein effect is a purely intrinsic mechanism, while the spin Hall effect origin can be either intrinsic or extrinsic.

Physical origin

The origin of the Rashba–Edelstein effect relies on the presence of spin-split surface or interface states, which can arise for a structural inversion asymmetry or because the material exhibits a topologically protected surface, being a topological insulator. In both cases, the material surface displays the spin polarization locked to the momentum, meaning that these two quantities are univocally linked and orthogonal one to the other (this is clearly visible from the Fermi countours). It is worth noticing that also a bulk inversion asymmetry could be present, which would result in the Dresselhaus effect. In fact, if, in addition to the spatial inversion asymmetry or to the topological insulator band structure, also a bulk inversion asymmetry is present, the spin and momentum are still locked but their relative orientation is not straightforwardly determinable (since also the orientation of the charge current with respect to the crystallographic axes plays a relevant role). In the following discussion, the Dresselhaus effect will be neglected, for simplicity.

The topological insulator case is easier to visualize due to the presence of a single Fermi contour, therefore the topological insulator case is discussed first. Topological insulators display spin-split surface states where spin-momentum locking is present. Indeed, when a charge current flows in the surface states of the topological insulator, it can also be seen as a well-defined momentum shift  in the reciprocal space, resulting in a different occupation of the spin-polarized branches of the Dirac cone. This unbalance, accordingly to the structure of the topological insulator band dispersion relation, produces a spin accumulation in the investigated material, i.e., a charge-to-spin conversion occurs. The spin accumulation is orthogonal to the injected charge current, accordingly to spin-momentum locking. Due to the fact that these materials display a conductive behaviour on their surface while being insulating on their bulk, the charge current is only allowed to flow on the topological insulator surfaces: this is the origin of the bidimensionality of this charge-to-spin conversion mechanism.

For what concerns the Rashba–Edelstein effect, the spin-split dispersion relation consists in two bands displaced along the k-axis due to a structural inversion asymmetry (SIA), accordingly to the Rashba effect (i.e., these bands show a linear splitting in k due to the spin-orbit coupling). This results in two Fermi countours, which are concentric at equilibrium, both displaying spin-momentum locking but with opposite helicity. If the system is driven in an out-of-equilibrium condition by injecting a charge current, the two disk displace one from the other and a net spin accumulation arises. This effect occurs, for instance, in a bidimensional Rashba gas. The Rashba splitting complicates the understanding and the visualization of the spin-to-charge conversion mechanism but the basic working principle of the Rashba–Edelstein effect is very similar to the one of the Edelstein effect.

Experimentally speaking, the Rashba–Edelstein effect occurs if a charge current is electrically injected inside the topological insulator, for instance by means of two electrodes where a potential difference is applied. The resulting spin accumulation can be probed in several ways, one of them is by employing the magneto optical Kerr effect (MOKE).

Inverse Rashba–Edelstein effect

The reverse process, i.e., the inverse Rashba–Edelstein effect (I(R)EE) occurs when a spin accumulation is generated inside the investigated material and a consequent charge current arises on the material surface (in this case, we have a 2D spin-to-charge conversion). In order to have the inverse Rashba–Edelstein effect, a spin accumulation is required to be generated inside the analyzed material and this spin injection is usually achieved by coupling the material under investigation with a ferromagnet in order to perform the spin pumping or with a semiconductor where it is possible to perform optical orientation. As for the direct effect, the inverse Rashba–Edelstein effect occurs in materials lacking the structural inversion symmetry, while in topological insulators the inverse Edelstein effect arises.

In the case of the inverse Edelstein effect, by looking at the section of the Dirac cone, the spin-to-charge conversion can be visualized as follows: the spin injection produces a piling up of spins of one character in one of the energy dispersion relation branches. This results in a spin unbalance due to the different branch occupations (i.e., a spin accumulation), which leads to a momentum unbalance and, therefore, to a charge current which can be electrically probed. As for the direct effect, also in the inverse Edelstein effect, the charge current can only flow on the topological insulator surfaces due to the energy band conformation. This is how the 2D spin-to-charge conversion occurs in these materials and this could allow topological insulators to be exploited as spin detectors.

As for the direct effect, this analysis has been carried out for the inverse Edelstein effect because in this case only two energy branches are present. For what concerns the inverse Rashba–Edelstein effect, the process is very similar despite the presence of four energy branches, with spin-momentum locking, in the dispersion relation and two consequent Fermi countours with opposite helicity. In this case, the two Fermi countours, when a spin accumulation is generated inside the material, will be displaced one from the other, generating a charge current, at variance with the equilibrium case in which the two Fermi countours are concentric and no net momentum unbalance nor spin accumulation are present.

Process efficiency

While both the Rashba–Edelstein effect and the inverse Rashba–Edelstein effect rely on a spin accumulation, the figure of merit of the processes is commonly computed by accounting for the spin current density related to the spin accumulation, instead of the spin accumulation itself, in analogy with the spin Hall angle for the spin Hall effect. Indeed, the efficiency of the Rashba–Edelstein effect and of the inverse Rashba–Edelstein effect can be estimated by means of the Rashba–Edelstein length, i.e., the ratio between the charge current density, flowing on the surface of the investigated material, (i.e., a surface charge current density) and the three-dimensional spin current density (since the spin accumulation can diffuse in the three-dimensional space).

In the Rashba–Edelstein effect the spin current is a consequence of the spin accumulation that occurs in the material as the charge current flows on its surface (under the influence of a potential difference and, therefore, of an electric field), while in the inverse Rashba–Edelstein effect the spin current is the quantity injected inside the material leading to a spin accumulation and resulting in a charge flow localized at the material surface. In both cases, the asymmetry in the charge and spin current dimensions results in a ratio which dimensionally has the units of a length: this is the origin of the name of this efficiency parameter.

Analytically, the value of the bidimensional charge current density can be computed employing the Boltzmann equation and considering the action of an electric field , resulting in:
,
The spin current density can be also analytically computed by integrating across the Fermi surface the product of the spin polarization and the corresponding distribution function.
In the Edelstein effect case, this quantity results in:
,
where  is the unit vector perpendicular to the surface on which the charge current flows.
From these formula it can be observed the orthogonality of the spin and the charge current densities.

For what regards the Edelstein and its inverse effects, the conversion efficiency is:
. 
This parameter is conventionally positive for a Fermi contour with a counterclockwise helicity.
.

The Rashba–Edelstein length of the investigated material can be compared to other spin-charge interconversion efficiencies, as the spin-Hall angle, to establish if this material is an efficient spin-charge interconverter, and, therefore, if it could be suitable for spintronic applications. The Rashba–Edelstein length (2D spin-charge interconversion efficiency) can be effectively compared to the spin Hall angle (3D spin-charge interconversion efficiency), by dividing the  parameter for the thickness of the spin-splitted surface states in which this 2D conversion occurs. This "equivalent" spin Hall angle for the Rashba–Edelstein effect often results in being close to the unity or even greater than the unity: the Rashba–Edelstein effect, on average, is a more efficient spin-charge interconversion mechanism than the spin Hall effect and this could lead to a future employment of materials displaying this effect in the technological industry.

See also 

Spin Hall effect
Topological insulator
Rashba effect
Dresselhaus effect
Spintronics

References 

Condensed matter physics
Spintronics
Semiconductors
Quantum magnetism